There exists also another river named Aurach that is a tributary of the Regnitz, see Aurach (Regnitz, Oberfranken). For other uses, see Aurach (disambiguation).

Aurach (also: Mittlere Aurach) is a river of Bavaria, Germany. It is a tributary of the river Regnitz.

The river Aurach begins in the Franconian Heights to the west of the village Klausaurach in the municipality of Markt Erlbach. It runs through Aurachtal, the town of Herzogenaurach, and the Erlangen district of Frauenaurach. After crossing under the Main-Danube Canal, it joins the river Regnitz at the Erlangen district of Erlangen-Bruck.

A recreational cycle path runs alongside the river Aurach from Herzogenaurach to Erlangen.

See also
List of rivers of Bavaria

References

Rivers of Bavaria
Rivers of Germany